John Andersen Snersrud (October 1, 1902 - August 10, 1986) was a Norwegian skier who competed in Nordic combined in the 1920s. He won a Nordic combined bronze medal at the 1928 Winter Olympics in St. Moritz.

External links
 
 
 

1902 births
1986 deaths
Norwegian male Nordic combined skiers
Olympic Nordic combined skiers of Norway
Nordic combined skiers at the 1928 Winter Olympics
Olympic bronze medalists for Norway
Olympic medalists in Nordic combined
Medalists at the 1928 Winter Olympics
20th-century Norwegian people